Pax Britannica (Latin for "British Peace", modelled after Pax Romana) was the period of relative peace between the great powers during which the British Empire became the global hegemonic power and adopted the role of a "global policeman".

Victory over Napoleonic France left the British without any serious international rival, other than perhaps Russia in Central Asia. When Russia tried expanding its influence in the Balkans, the British and French defeated them in the Crimean War (1853–1856), thereby protecting the Ottoman Empire.

Britain's Royal Navy controlled most of the key maritime trade routes and enjoyed unchallenged sea power. Alongside the formal control exerted over its own colonies, Britain's dominant position in world trade meant that it effectively controlled access to many regions, such as Asia, North America, Oceania, and Africa. The British also, much to the dismay of other colonial empires, helped the United States uphold the Monroe Doctrine which upheld its economic dominance in the Americas. British merchants, shippers and bankers had such an overwhelming advantage over those of other empires that in addition to its colonies it had an informal empire.

History

After losing the Thirteen Colonies, a significant part of British America, in the American Revolution, Britain turned towards Asia, the Pacific and later Africa with subsequent exploration leading to the rise of the Second British Empire (1783–1815). The Industrial Revolution began in Great Britain in the late 1700s and new ideas emerged about free markets, such as Adam Smith's The Wealth of Nations (1776). Free trade became a central principle that Britain practiced by the 1840s. It played a key role in Britain's economic growth and financial dominance.

From the end of the Napoleonic Wars in 1815 until World War I in 1914, the United Kingdom played the role of global hegemon (most powerful actor).  Imposition of a "British Peace" on key maritime trade routes began in 1815 with the annexation of British Ceylon (now Sri Lanka). Under the British Residency of the Persian Gulf, local Arab rulers agreed to a number of treaties that formalised Britain's protection of the region. Britain imposed an anti-piracy treaty, known as the General Maritime Treaty of 1820, on all Arab rulers in the region. By signing the Perpetual Maritime Truce of 1853, Arab rulers gave up their right to wage war at sea in return for British protection against external threats. The global superiority of British military and commerce was aided by a divided and relatively weak continental Europe, and the presence of the Royal Navy on all of the world's oceans and seas. Even outside its formal empire, Britain controlled trade with many countries such as China, Siam, and Argentina. Following the Congress of Vienna, the British Empire's economic strength continued to develop through naval dominance and diplomatic efforts to maintain a balance of power in continental Europe.

In this era, the Royal Navy provided services around the world that benefited other nations, such as suppressing piracy and blocking the slave trade. The Slave Trade Act 1807 had banned the trade across the British Empire, after which the Royal Navy established the West Africa Squadron and the government negotiated international treaties under which they could enforce the ban. Sea power, however, did not project on land. Land wars fought between the major powers include the Crimean War, the Franco-Austrian War, the Austro-Prussian War and the Franco-Prussian War, as well as numerous conflicts between lesser powers. The Royal Navy prosecuted the First Opium War (18391842) and Second Opium War (18561860) against Imperial China. The Royal Navy was superior to any other two navies in the world, combined. Between 1815 and the passage of the German naval laws of 1890 and 1898, only France was a potential naval threat.

The most decisive event emerged from the Anglo-Egyptian War, which resulted in the British occupation of Egypt for seven decades, even though the Ottoman Empire retained nominal ownership until 1914. Historian A. J. P. Taylor says that this "was a great event; indeed, the only real event in international relations between the Battle of Sedan and the defeat of Russia in the Russo-Japanese war". Taylor emphasizes the long-term impact:

 The British occupation of Egypt altered the balance of power. It not only gave the British security for their route to India; it made them masters of the Eastern Mediterranean and the Middle East; it made it unnecessary for them to stand in the front line against Russia at the Straits....And thus prepared the way for the Franco-Russian Alliance ten years later.

Britain traded goods and capital extensively with countries around the world, adopting a free trade policy after 1840. The growth of British imperial strength was further underpinned by the steamship and the telegraph, new technologies invented in the second half of the 19th century, allowing it to control and defend the empire. By 1902, the British Empire was linked together by a network of telegraph cables, the so-called All Red Line.

The Pax Britannica was weakened by the breakdown of the continental order which had been established by the Congress of Vienna. Relations between the Great Powers of Europe were strained to breaking point by issues such as the decline of the Ottoman Empire, which led to the Crimean War, and later the emergence of new nation states in the form of Italy and Germany after the Franco-Prussian War. Both of these wars involved Europe's largest states and armies. The industrialisation of Germany, the Empire of Japan, and the United States contributed to the relative decline of British industrial supremacy in the late 19th century. The start of World War I in 1914 marked the end of the Pax Britannica. However, the British Empire remained the biggest colonial empire until the start of decolonization after World War II ended in 1945, and Britain remained one of the leading powers until the Suez Crisis in 1956, during which British and French troops were forced to withdraw from Egypt under pressure from the United States and (to a lesser extent) the Soviet Union.

See also
 Historiography of the British Empire
 Imperial Federation
 List of wars involving the United Kingdom
 Pax Americana
 Pax Sovietica
 Pax Sinica
 Pax Romana
 Pax Hispanica
 Political history of the world

References

Citations

Sources and further reading

 Albrecht-Carrié, René. A Diplomatic History of Europe Since the Congress of Vienna (1958), 736pp; a basic introduction, online free to borrow
 Bartlett, C. J.  Peace, War and the European Powers, 1814-1914 (1996) brief overview 216pp
 Bury, J. P. T. ed. The New Cambridge Modern History: Vol. 10: the Zenith of European Power, 1830-70 (1964)
 
 Darby, H. C. and H. Fullard The New Cambridge Modern History, Vol. 14: Atlas (1972)
 
 
 
 Ferguson, Niall. Empire: The Rise and Demise of the British World Order and the Lessons for Global Power (2002),
 Hinsley, F.H., ed. The New Cambridge Modern History, vol. 11, Material Progress and World-Wide Problems 1870-1898 (1979)
 
 
 Kennedy, Paul. The Rise and Fall of the Great Powers Economic Change and Military Conflict From 1500-2000 (1987), stress on economic and military factors
 Kissinger, Henry. Diplomacy (1995), 940pp; not a memoir but an interpretive history of international diplomacy since the late 18th century
 
 
 
 
 Rich, Norman. Great Power Diplomacy: 1814-1914 (1991), comprehensive survey
 Seaman, L.C.B. From Vienna to Versailles (1955) 216pp; brief overview of diplomatic history online
 Seton-Watson, R. W. Britain in Europe, 1789–1914. (1938); comprehensive history online
 
 
 Ward, A.W. and G. P. Gooch, eds. The Cambridge History of British Foreign Policy, 1783-1919 (3 vol, 1921–23), old detailed classic; vol 1, 1783-1815 ;  vol 2, 1815-1866; vol 3. 1866-1919

 Primary sources

 

Latin political words and phrases
British Empire
Britannica
19th century in international relations
20th century in international relations
Rises to prominence